Zakuani is a surname. Notable people with the surname include:

Gabriel Zakuani (born 1986), Congolese footballer and manager
Steve Zakuani (born 1988), Congolese footballer, brother of Gabriel

Surnames of African origin